This is a list of hospitals in Denmark.

Capital Region of Denmark
Amager Hospital on the island of Amager, Copenhagen
Bispebjerg Hospital in Copenhagen
Bornholms Hospital on the island of Bornholm
Frederiksberg Hospital in Frederiksberg
Gentofte Hospital in Gentofte
Glostrup Hospital in Glostrup
Herlev Hospital in Herlev
Hvidovre Hospital in Hvidovre
Nordsjællands Hospital in Esbønderup, Frederikssund, Hillerød, Elsinore, and Hørsholm
Privathospitalet Danmark in Charlottenlund
Region Hovedstadens Psykiatri - psychiatric hospital with many centers around the region
Rigshospitalet in Copenhagen
Sct. Hans Hospital in Roskilde
Region Sjælland
Fakse Sygehus in Fakse
Holbæk Sygehus in Holbæk
Kalundborg Sygehus in Kalundborg
Korsør Sygehus in Korsør
Køge Sygehus in Køge
Nakskov Sygehus in Nakskov
Nykøbing Falster Sygehus in Nykøbing Falster
Nykøbing Sjællands Sygehus in Nykøbing Sjælland
Næstved Sygehus in Næstved
Ringsted Sygehus in Ringsted
Roskilde Sygehus in Roskilde
Slagelse Sygehus in Slagelse
Region of Southern Denmark
Augustenborg Psykiatrisk Hospital in Augustenborg
Brørup Hospital in Brørup
Esbjerg Hospital in Esbjerg
Fredericia Hospital in Fredericia
Fåborg Hospital in Fåborg
Give Hospital in Give
Grindsted Hospital in Grindsted
Haderslev Hospital in Haderslev
Kolding Hospital in Kolding
Middelfart Hospital in Middelfart
Nyborg Hospital in Nyborg
Odense Universitetshospital in Odense
Ribe Psykiatrisk Hospital in Ribe
Ringe Hospital in Ringe
Svendborg Hospital in Svendborg
Sønderborg Hospital in Sønderborg
Tønder Hospital in Tønder
Vejle Hospital in Vejle
Ærøskøbing Hospital on the island of Ærø
Aabenraa Hospital in Aabenraa
Region Midtjylland
Regionshospitalet Brædstrup in Brædstrup
Regionshospitalet Grenaa in Grenaa
Regionshospitalet Hammel Neurocenter in Hammel
Regionshospitalet Herning in Herning
Regionshospitalet Holstebro in Holstebro
Regionshospitalet Horsens in Horsens
Regionshospitalet Kjellerup in Kjellerup
Regionshospitalet Lemvig in Lemvig
Regionshospitalet Odder in Odder
Regionshospitalet Randers in Randers
Regionshospitalet Ringkøbing in Ringkøbing
Regionshospitalet Samsø on the island of Samsø
Regionshospitalet Silkeborg in Silkeborg
Regionshospitalet Skanderborg Sundhedscenter in Skanderborg
Regionshospitalet Skive in Skive
Regionshospitalet Tarm in Tarm
Regionshospitalet Viborg in Viborg
Aarhus Universitetshospital Skejby in Aarhus
Århus Universitetshospital Risskov in Århus
Aarhus University Hospital in Aarhus
Region Nordjylland
Aalborg Sygehus in Aalborg, Dronninglund, and Brovst
Sygehus Vendsyssel in Hjørring, Frederikshavn, and Brønderslev
Sundhedscenter Skagen in Skagen
Sygehus Himmerland in Farsø, Hobro, and Terndrup
Sygehus Thy-Mors in Thisted and Nykøbing Jylland
Private Hospitals
Allerød Privathospital in Allerød
Dan Clinic in Beder
Erichsens Privathospital in Klampenborg
Esbjerg Privathospital in Esbjerg
Aleris-Hamlet Hospitaler in Frederiksberg, Aalborg, Århus and Herning 
Hellerup Privathospital in Hellerup
Ciconia Århus Privathospital in Højbjerg
Privathospitalet Kollund in Kollund
Absalon Privatklinik in Copenhagen
Nygart Privathospital in Copenhagen
Parkens Privathospital in Copenhagen
Privathospitalet Mølholm in Herlev, Odense, Risskov, Vejle, and Århus
Privathospitalet Hunderup in Odense
Privathospitalet Skørping in Skørping
HjerteCenter Varde in Varde
Dagkirurgisk Hospital Viborg in Viborg
Søllerød Privathospital in Virum
Aros Privathospital in Århus
Grymer Privathospital in Århus

References
The list of hospitals above was gathered from information on the following websites:
Region Hovedstaden
Region Sjælland
Region of Southern Denmark
Region Midtjylland
Region Nordjylland
Brancheforeningen for privathospitaler og klinikker

Denmark
 
Hospitals
Denmark